Xavier Becerra (born January 26, 1958) is an American lawyer and politician serving as the 25th United States secretary of health and human services since March 2021. Becerra previously served as the attorney general of California from January 2017 until March 2021. He was a member of the United States House of Representatives, representing Downtown Los Angeles in Congress from 1993 to 2017. A member of the Democratic Party, Becerra was Chairman of the House Democratic Caucus from 2013 to 2017.

Born in Sacramento, California, Becerra graduated from Stanford University and received his Juris Doctor degree from Stanford Law School. He worked as a lawyer at the Legal Assistance Corporation of central Massachusetts, before returning to California in 1986 to work as an administrative assistant for state senator Art Torres. He served as a deputy attorney general in the California Department of Justice from 1987 to 1990 before he was elected to the California State Assembly, where he served one term from 1990 to 1992.

Becerra was first elected to the House of Representatives in 1992. He represented California's 30th congressional district from 1993 to 2003, California's 31st congressional district from 2003 to 2013, and California's 34th congressional district from 2013 to 2017. He served as Chairman of the Congressional Hispanic Caucus from 1997 to 1999, Vice Chairman of the House Democratic Caucus from 2009 to 2013, and as a member of the Joint Select Committee on Deficit Reduction.

Early life and education
Born in Sacramento, California, on January 26, 1958, Becerra is the son of working-class parents, Maria Teresa and Manuel Guerrero Becerra. His father was born in the U.S. and raised in Tijuana, Mexico, and his mother was from Guadalajara. As a child, Becerra grew up in a one-room apartment with his three sisters. He graduated in 1976 from C.K. McClatchy High School, located in the center of Sacramento. He studied abroad at the University of Salamanca in Salamanca, Spain, from 1978 to 1979, before earning his Bachelor of Arts in economics from Stanford University in 1980, becoming the first person in his family to graduate from college. He received his Juris Doctor from Stanford Law School in 1984, and was admitted to the State Bar of California in 1985.

Early career 
Becerra began his career as a lawyer, working on cases involving individuals who had mental disorders for the Legal Assistance Corporation of Central Massachusetts (now Community Legal Aid).

Becerra worked as an administrative assistant for California state senator Art Torres in 1986. He served as a deputy attorney general in the California Department of Justice under Attorney General John Van de Kamp from 1987 to 1990.

After incumbent state assemblyman Charles Calderon decided to seek a seat in the California Senate, Becerra launched a grass-roots campaign for the California State Assembly, defeating Calderon's Senate aide Marta Maestas in the Democratic primary. He went on to defeat Republican Lee Lieberg and Libertarian Steven Pencall, receiving 60% of the vote. Becerra served one term in the State Assembly, representing California's 59th district, from 1990 to 1992. As a state legislator, Becerra worked to pass a law that would increase gang members' sentences.

U.S. House of Representatives (1993–2017)

Elections
In 1992, 25th district congressman Edward Roybal announced his retirement after 30 years in Congress. Becerra entered the race for the seat, which had been renumbered as the 30th district after redistricting.

Becerra won the Democratic primary with a plurality of 32% of the vote. In the general election, he defeated Republican nominee Morry Waksberg, 58%–24%. He won re-election to a second term in 1994 with 66% of the vote. His district was renumbered as the 31st district after the 2000 census.

After redistricting, ahead of the 2012 elections, most of Becerra's old district became the 34th district. He defeated Republican Stephen Smith 85.6% to 14.4%.

Tenure

Becerra was a member of the Congressional Hispanic Caucus, of which he served as chairman during the 105th Congress.

Becerra voted against the Emergency Economic Stabilization Act of 2008 because he "wanted to see direct protections for responsible homeowners" in the bill.

Becerra was appointed assistant to the Speaker of the House for the 110th Congress. He won his bid to succeed John Larson as Vice-Chair in the 111th Congress, defeating Marcy Kaptur of Ohio by a vote of 175–67.

Becerra successfully ran for a second term as Vice-Chair in 2011 to serve during the 112th Congress.

During the 111th Congress and 112th Congress, Becerra served on several high-profile committees. He was appointed to serve on the National Commission on Fiscal Responsibility and Reform (often called Bowles-Simpson/Simpson-Bowles) on March 24, 2010. Becerra was selected to serve on the Joint Select Committee on Deficit Reduction (also known as the Super Committee) on August 11, 2011. And on December 23, 2011, he was appointed to serve on a bi-cameral conference committee to find bi-partisan solutions on middle-class tax cuts, unemployment insurance, and the Medicare physician payment rate.

Becerra had a seat on the House Ways and Means Committee and was the first Latino to serve on the committee.

Abortion rights and pay equity
A writer for Vanity Fair described Becerra as a "strident supporter of women's health and reproductive rights"; The New York Times stated that he has been "vocal in the Democratic Party about fighting for women's health". He voted against H.R. 3541, the Prenatal Non-Discrimination Act (PRENDA), which would have imposed civil and criminal penalties on anyone knowingly attempting to perform a sex-selective abortion. The 2012 bill also would have required health care providers to report known or suspected violations to law enforcement, including suspicions about a woman's motives for seeking an abortion. Becerra received a 100% rating from Planned Parenthood and NARAL Pro-Choice America in 2012. Becerra voted for the Lilly Ledbetter Fair Pay Act of 2009.

Becerra argued before the United States Court of Appeals for the Ninth Circuit that the Little Sisters of the Poor, a Catholic religious order, should be required to provide birth control services under the Affordable Care Act. In late 2020, arguing that the prosecution would discourage pregnant women from obtaining addiction treatment, Becerra requested that the Supreme Court of California block the murder prosecution of a woman who had consumed methamphetamine during her pregnancy, resulting in a stillbirth. The court declined to do so. In response to the Trump administration's 2020 decision to restrict federal funding to California because it requires insurance providers to cover abortion, Becerra stated that "California has the sovereign right to protect women's reproductive rights".

Committee assignments
Committee on Ways and Means
Subcommittee on Oversight
Subcommittee on Health
Subcommittee on Social Security
Joint Select Committee on Deficit Reduction

Caucus memberships
Congressional Hispanic Caucus (Former Chair)
Congressional Asian Pacific American Caucus
Congressional Progressive Caucus

Other political ambitions

2001 Los Angeles mayoral election

Becerra ran for mayor of Los Angeles in 2001. He finished with 6% of the primary vote, finishing behind businessman Steve Soboroff, Councilman Joel Wachs, former California State Assembly Speaker Antonio Villaraigosa, and the eventual winner, then-City Attorney James Hahn.

Consideration for federal government positions
In 2008, Becerra was considered for the position of U.S. Trade Representative in the administration of President-elect Obama. While it was reported that he had already accepted, he announced on December 15 that he would not accept the position. Becerra had endorsed then-Senator Barack Obama for president on January 27, 2008.

Becerra was on the shortlist of presumptive Democratic presidential nominee Hillary Clinton for the vice presidential nomination in 2016. Senator Tim Kaine was eventually chosen.

During the presidential transition of Joe Biden in 2020, it was reported that Becerra was being considered for the Cabinet positions of Secretary of Homeland Security and Attorney General.

2020 U.S. Senate speculation
In August 2020, California Senator Kamala Harris was selected by presumptive Democratic presidential nominee Joe Biden as his vice presidential running mate. After Biden ultimately won the general election, Becerra was floated as a possible replacement for Harris, along with others such as Representative Karen Bass, Representative Barbara Lee, Secretary of State Alex Padilla (who was eventually chosen), and former Secretary of Labor Hilda Solís. Early December reports that Biden planned to nominate Becerra as Secretary of Health and Human Services rendered such speculation moot.

California Attorney General (2017–2021)

Becerra accepted Governor Jerry Brown's offer to be the attorney general of California on December 1, 2016. The California Legislature confirmed Becerra to the post on January 23, 2017. He succeeded Kamala Harris, who was elected to the United States Senate. Becerra was sworn in January 24, 2017, becoming the first Latino to serve as California's attorney general. Becerra was elected to a full four-year term in 2018, after defeating Republican challenger Steven Bailey and securing 61 percent of the vote.

While Attorney General, Becerra delivered the Democratic Spanish-language response to President Trump's 2019 State of the Union address.

California Department of Justice reforms 
In 2018, Becerra created an environmental justice branch of the California Department of Justice. Among other projects, it opposed the effort to expand San Bernardino International Airport due to concerns regarding air pollution.

California law enforcement 
Becerra brought fourteen felony charges against Center for Medical Progress activists for recording fourteen videos (see Planned Parenthood 2015 undercover videos controversy), and one felony charge for conspiring to invade privacy, on March 28, 2017. The charges were dismissed by a California Superior Court judge in June for not stating the names of those recorded and the specific dates of the recordings; the charges were refiled with the names and dates in July 2017.

In 2019, Becerra threatened "legal action" against reporters who had received records of California law enforcement officers who had been convicted of crimes during the past decade.

In December 2020, Becerra was faulted by state district attorneys for not taking leadership to help stop unemployment fraud during the COVID-19 pandemic, in what was described as the "biggest taxpayer fraud in California history". In January 2021, investigators said the total fraud was over $11 billion, with $19 billion in claims still under investigation. Most of this money will likely never be recovered, prosecutors said.

Lawsuits against Trump administration 
In February 2019, Becerra, Governor Gavin Newsom, and 15 other states filed a lawsuit against the Trump administration over the president's declaration of a national emergency to fund a wall at the southern U.S. border. As of September 26, 2019, Becerra had sued the Trump administration 62 times in total.

The Trump administration opened 1 million acres in California to fracking and drilling in December 2019. Under the new policy, the Bureau of Land Management proposed new lease sales for oil and gas extraction along "California's Central Valley and Central Coast, touching eight counties and including 400,000 acres of public land". California officials and agencies, including Becerra, filed a lawsuit against the Bureau of Land Management in January 2020.

Despite the multiple lawsuits against the Trump administration filed with other state attorneys general, Becerra had not joined antitrust efforts against any major tech companies. His office would not disclose whether it had examined any tech companies and had not endorsed any joint investigations with other states. On December 9, 2020, it was reported that Becerra's office had joined 47 other states and the Federal Trade Commission in an antitrust lawsuit against Facebook, Inc, headquartered in California.

Ballot drafting 
As Attorney General of California, Becerra was tasked with writing ballot titles and summaries that appeared on voter information guides and ballots in both the 2018 and 2020 elections. Proponents accused Becerra multiple times of writing biased descriptions that violated the law, which requires "a true and impartial statement of the purpose" of measures. In one of many unsuccessful lawsuits against Becerra, a state judge wrote that attorneys general have "wide latitude" in how they write ballot descriptions. Critics said the responsibility to write the ballot title and summary should be transferred to a different, non-partisan office.

Secretary of Health and Human Services (2021–present)

Confirmation 
After Joe Biden's election as president in November 2020, Becerra was considered a candidate for United States Attorney General. The New York Times reported in early December 2020 that Biden would nominate Becerra as Secretary of Health and Human Services. His nomination to lead the Health and Human Services Department has been criticized by pro-life and conservative leaders led by Students for Life of America, citing his "absence of health care experience and his disregard for people of faith". Becerra's nomination was deadlocked by the Senate's Finance Committee on March 10, 2021. One day later, on March 11, 2021, Becerra's nomination was discharged from the Finance Committee by the entire Senate, in a vote of 51-48. He was confirmed by the Senate in a vote of 50-49 on March 18, 2021, with all but one Democrat present and one Republican, Susan Collins, voting in favor. This was the narrowest vote for any of Biden's cabinet positions. On March 22, 2021, Becerra was sworn in to be the new secretary.

Tenure 

Soon after officially becoming the Secretary of Health and Human Services, Becerra released a statement praising the Affordable Care Act and encouraging people to keep enrolling in its health care program.

Becerra has been widely criticized as health and human services secretary for being absent in the public eye during the pandemic, for being responsible for confusing messaging by federal public health authorities and for the subsequent loss of public trust, and for his passive management style while serving as secretary, with some administration officials, public health experts, and scientists calling for him to improve his performance or step aside; his defenders said he was given an unclear role as secretary. Becerra was similarly criticized following his agency's response to the 2022 monkeypox outbreak amid issues with health policy communication and what was widely considered a slow response; White House officials said that Becerra sought to scapegoat the states to avoid criticism rather than take responsibility for the subpar response.

On October 6, 2022, Becerra was tasked by President Biden with expeditiously reviewing the Schedule I classification of Cannabis.

Personal life
Becerra is married to physician Carolina Reyes, and they have three daughters. He is a member of the Inter-American Dialogue think tank, based in Washington, D.C. Becerra is Roman Catholic.

Election history

California State Assembly

U.S. House of Representatives

California Attorney General

See also
List of first minority male lawyers and judges in California
List of Hispanic and Latino Americans in the United States Congress

References

External links

 Campaign website

 
 Join California Xavier Becerra

|-

|- 

|-

|-

|-

|-

|-

|-

|-

|-

|-

1958 births
21st-century American politicians
American politicians of Mexican descent
Biden administration cabinet members
California Attorneys General
Catholics from California
Democratic Party members of the United States House of Representatives from California
Hispanic and Latino American members of the Cabinet of the United States
Hispanic and Latino American members of the United States Congress
Hispanic and Latino American state legislators in California
Living people
Democratic Party members of the California State Assembly
Members of the Inter-American Dialogue
Mexican-American people in California politics
Politicians from Los Angeles
Politicians from Sacramento, California
Stanford Law School alumni
Stanford University alumni
United States Secretaries of Health and Human Services
University of Salamanca alumni
Biden administration personnel